Prachantakham is a district (amphoe) of Prachinburi province, eastern Thailand.

Geography
Neighboring districts are (from the east clockwise): Na Di, Kabin Buri, Si Maha Phot, Mueang Prachinburi of Prachinburi Province; Pak Phli of Nakhon Nayok province; Pak Chong and Wang Nam Khiao of Nakhon Ratchasima province.

The Sankamphaeng Range mountains is in the northern section of this district.

Administration
The district is divided into nine sub-districts (tambons), which are further subdivided into 106 villages (mubans). Prachantakham is a township (thesaban tambon) which covers parts of tambon Prachantakham. There are a further nine tambon administrative organizations (TAO).

References

External links
amphoe.com (Thai)

Prachantakham